Ash Is Purest White ('Sons and Daughters of Jianghu') is a 2018 Chinese  drama directed by Jia Zhangke. It was selected to compete for the Palme d'Or at the 2018 Cannes Film Festival. The story is loosely based on the leader of a gang from Jia Zhangke's childhood, whom he had admired as a role model. Like the rest of Jia's films, it opened to widespread acclaim.

Plot
In 2001, Qiao and her boyfriend Bin, a mob boss, have a lot of power in Datong, an old mining city that has become poor since the coal prices dropped. After Bin's boss is murdered, Qiao suggests they run away from everything and get married, but Bin isn't interested. One night a group of motorcyclists attack Bin and his driver, claiming to dethrone him. Qiao grabs Bin's handgun and fires two warning shots into the air, scaring off the attackers.

The police tell Qiao that the gun is illegally owned and asks her whose it is; she repeatedly claims it's hers. She spends five years in prison for possessing an illegal firearm but Bin does not visit her during that time. After Qiao is released, she tries to call him but can never seem to get in touch. She travels by boat to the city in Hubei province where Bin is living but is instead greeted by Bin's new girlfriend — meanwhile, Bin hides in another room. Qiao says that if he wants to break up with her, he'll have to tell her himself. She has almost no money to her name so she cons a few strangers for money and food. She hires a motorcycle driver to take her to the power plant where she thinks that Bin works, and along the way the driver suggests that they have sex. She uses this opportunity to steal his bike, and when she gets to the power plant she reports to a police officer that the driver tried to rape her and that he should call her boyfriend Bin. This finally forces Bin to see her.

In a hotel room, Bin says he's a changed man, no longer a "jianghu" gangster, and has no place in his life for Qiao anymore. He can never go back to Datong because he has lost all the respect he once had there. Qiao says that she saved his life and took the blame for him: he should have been waiting for her the day she got out of prison. Since he refuses to say it, she finally says that their relationship is over and he leaves. On a train back to Datong, she meets a passenger who claims to be developing a UFO-hunting tourism company and invites her to join him after she claims to have seen one herself. But after they transfer onto another train, he admits that it was all a lie. She gets off the train, sees a bright object fly swiftly overhead, and makes her way back to Datong.

In 2017, Qiao gets a call from Bin, and when she picks him up, finds him using a wheelchair. She brings him back to their old gambling parlor where she now works and many of his old friends are happy to see him. He is closed-off and hot-tempered, immediately starting fights, and Qiao nearly throws him out. He tells her that he had a stroke from drinking too much and she finds a doctor to help rehabilitate him. When he can walk again, he sneaks out of Qiao's building with just a brief voicemail to say he has left. Qiao goes to the front door when she learns he has gone but she cannot see him.

Cast

 Zhao Tao as Zhao Qiao
 Liao Fan as Guo Bin
 Feng Xiaogang
 Xu Zheng
 Zhang Yibai

Response

Box office
Ash Is Purest White grossed $422,814 in the United States and Canada, and $11.6 million in other territories, for a worldwide total of $12 million.

Critical reception
The website's critical consensus reads, "Ash Is Purest White finds writer-director Zhangke Jia revisiting familiar themes while continuing to observe modern Chinese society with an urgent, empathetic eye." On Metacritic, the film has an average weighted score of 85 out of 100, based on 34 critics, indicating "universal acclaim". A. A. Dowd of The A.V. Club gave the film a B+. The theme of self-sacrifice, rather than revenge, has been highlighted, with the context of the development of China. Barack Obama included the film on his 2019 end of year favorites list.

Accolades

References

External links
 
 

2018 films
2018 drama films
Chinese drama films
2010s Mandarin-language films
Films directed by Jia Zhangke
Films set in 2001
Films set in 2006
Films set in 2017
Films set in 2018
Films set in Shanxi
Films shot in Shanxi
Gangster films